Strapped Live! is a live album by the ska/soul band The Pietasters, recorded at two shows in 1995 and released in 1996 (see 1996 in music).

Track listing
"Without You" – 3:02
"Tell You Why" – 4:16
"Something Better" – 3:57
"Must Catch a Train" – 4:39
"Fiesta" – 4:00
"Girl Take It Easy" – 4:31
"Pleasure Bribe" – 3:50
"Little Engine" – 3:28
"Biblical Sense" – 3:38
"Night Owl" – 2:43
"Perfect World" – 3:09
"Dollar Bill" – 3:50
"Freak Show" – 3:02
"Movin' On Up" – 3:55
"Drinkin' and Drivin'" – 2:48
"Factory" – 3:26

Personnel
Stephen Jackson – vocals
Tom Goodin – guitar
Todd Eckhardt – bass guitar
Rob Steward – drums
Alan Makranczy – saxophone
Jeremy Roberts – trombone, backing vocals
Toby Hansen – trumpet
Paul T. Ackerman – keyboards
Caz Gardiner – vocals on track 4
Shannon Walton – engineer, recorder

References

The Pietasters albums
1996 live albums